Free Land may refer to:

Free Land (novel), a novel by Rose Wilder Lane
Free Land (film), a 1946 German drama film
Free Land (newspaper), a Hungarian newspaper

See also
Freeland (disambiguation)